Ipeľský Sokolec, formerly Sakáloš is a village and municipality in the Levice District in the Nitra Region of Slovakia.

History
In historical records the village was first mentioned in 1386.

Geography
The village lies at an altitude of 116 metres and covers an area of 18.148 km². It has a population of about 870 people.

Ethnicity
The village is approximately 87% Magyar and 13% Slovak.

Facilities
The village has a public library a gym and soccer pitch.

Genealogical resources

The records for genealogical research are available at the state archive "Statny Archiv in Banska Bystrica, Nitra, Slovakia"

 Roman Catholic church records (births/marriages/deaths): 1714-1896 (parish A)
 Lutheran church records (births/marriages/deaths): 1793-1895 (parish B)
 Reformated church records (births/marriages/deaths): 1833-1895 (parish B)

See also
 List of municipalities and towns in Slovakia

External links
 
https://web.archive.org/web/20071027094149/http://www.statistics.sk/mosmis/eng/run.html
Surnames of living people in Ipelsky Sokolec

Villages and municipalities in Levice District
Hungarian communities in Slovakia